1925 in philosophy

Events 
Royal Institute of Philosophy was founded in 1925.

Publications 
 Alfred North Whitehead, Science and the Modern World (1925)
 G. E. Moore, "A Defence of Common Sense" (1925)

Births 
 January 18 - Gilles Deleuze 
 January 20 - Ernesto Cardenal 
 May 17 - Michel de Certeau 
 May 19 - Malcolm X (died 1965)
 June 16 - Jean d'Ormesson (died 2017)
 June 27 - Michael Dummett 
 July 20 - Frantz Fanon 
 October 13 - Lenny Bruce (died 1966)
 November 19 - Zygmunt Bauman (died 2017)
 December 4 - Albert Bandura 
 December 9 - Ernest Gellner

Deaths 
 March 30 - Rudolf Steiner (born 1861)
 July 26 - Gottlob Frege (born 1848)

References 

Philosophy
20th-century philosophy
Philosophy by year